Wilburn Rue Butland (March 22, 1918 – September 19, 1997) was an American professional baseball pitcher who appeared in 32 games in Major League Baseball for the Boston Red Sox over four seasons between 1940 and 1947. Born in Terre Haute, Indiana, Butland batted right-handed and threw left-handed.

In his four-season MLB career, Butland posted a 9–3 record with 62 strikeouts and a 3.88 earned run average in 150 innings pitched. His lone full season in the majors was 1942, in which he appeared in 23 games, won seven, lost one, threw two shutouts and six complete games, and posted a sparkling 2.51 ERA. He handled 46 total chances (15 putouts, 31 assists) in his major league career without an error for a perfect 1.000 fielding percentage.

Butland's pro career lasted from 1936 through 1950, although he missed three seasons due to service in the United States Army during World War II. He died in Terre Haute at age 79 on September 19, 1997.

External links

Bill Butland at SABR (Baseball BioProject)
MLB historical statistics

1918 births
1997 deaths
Baseball players from Indiana
Boston Red Sox players
Crookston Pirates players
Eau Claire Bears players
Jacksonville Tars players
Louisville Colonels (minor league) players
Major League Baseball pitchers
Minneapolis Millers (baseball) players
Roanoke Red Sox players
St. Augustine Saints players
Scranton Red Sox players
Sportspeople from Terre Haute, Indiana
Syracuse Chiefs players
Toledo Mud Hens players
United States Army personnel of World War II
United States Army soldiers